Ornithuroscincus nototaenia is a species of skink found in Papua New Guinea.

References

Ornithuroscincus
Reptiles described in 1914
Taxa named by George Albert Boulenger